Bitch is a 2017 American dark comedy film written and directed by Marianna Palka.

Plot 
Jill Hart, a stay-at-home mom in the L.A. suburbs, is at breaking point from stress, and from the lengthy work absence of her philandering husband Bill. Alone, she toys with and fails to commit suicide by hanging herself with a dog leash. Her state worsens, in parallel with being troubled by a mysterious dog that visits their garden much of the time, watching the house. Jill suffers a mental breakdown, and vanishes, leaving Bill torn between work and care of their four children.

Initially fearing she has left or been abducted or harmed, the children find her faeces smeared clothing and phone in the house after school, and later locate Jill in the basement where she has snapped and reverted to behaving like a dog. She snarls and barks at the family as they peer downstairs.

Out of his depth and trying to maintain the appearance of normality, Bill seeks refuge in focusing on his work needs and minimising his engagement with his wife's condition.  He is pressured by Jill's sister Beth to stop shirking and contact the family doctor, but focuses on his work stresses and on keeping the matter secret. He blames his wife for the change to their situation and for selfishly (as he sees it) placing extra work on him to support the family, and blames the doctor for suggesting she needs to be taken into psychiatric hospital care. He begins secretly drinking vodka from the bottle, flushes his wedding ring down the shower drain, neglects work and is fired, and his behaviour disconcerts and pushes away the children. Jill remains in the basement, her behaviour remains feral and aggressive in both bark and snarl. However, gradually Bill and Beth begin to open up to each other and he begins to work with her and support the children as a family, for the good of all. He buys dog toys for Jill, then gently suggests the children stop offering the toys to her, when their attempts to engage increase Jill's stress.

The co-worker whom Bill had been having an affair with, visits Bills house. He sends her away but Beth is furious believing he invited her, and Jill, agitated, escapes, although they find her unharmed by the roadside. Later Beth reveals her family is filing legal papers for custody of her sister, and leaves. At an initial medical meeting, Bill believes the concern is his conduct rather than Jill's best interests, and begins to understand how selfish he had been to her, during their marriage. He sadly accepts medical help and Jill is sedated and removed to a hospital. Living with the children, he does chores, and cleans the basement. His wedding ring is found by a plumber, and he puts it back on. The family move house. His development as a caring parent continues and is reciprocated by the children. The relationship with Beth is healed.

Jill comes home for the first time, the children staying with Beth. She still behaves like a dog but is much calmer. He takes Jill on all fours to the local dog park to meet other dogs, and plays on all fours himself to encourage her to play. Later that night, his attempt to help her by offering a shower triggers an aggressive relapse, and then results in Jill traumatically remembering herself. He holds her and talks reassuringly as she uncontrollably sobs. The next morning, in bed, she tentatively gives Bill her first real smile.

Cast
Marianna Palka as Jill Hart
Jason Ritter as Bill Hart
Jaime King as Beth
Brighton Sharbino as Tiffany Hart
Rio Mangini as Max Hart
Jason Maybaum as Jed Hart
Kingston Foster as Cindy Hart
Sol Rodriguez as Annabelle
Arielle Kebbel as Cindy's teacher (name unknown)

Release
The film was released on November 10, 2017.

Reception
On review aggregator website Rotten Tomatoes, the film holds an approval rating of 67% based on 39 reviews, and an average rating of 6.1/10. The website's critical consensus reads, "Bitch has an intriguing premise and a strong start that hints at greater things for writer-director-star Marianna Palka, even if its reach ultimately exceeds its grasp." On Metacritic, the film has a weighted average score of 55 out of 100, based on 12 critics, indicating "mixed or average reviews".

Christy Lemire of Roger Ebert gave the film 1.5 stars out of 4 stating the film "has a bark that’s far worse than its bite". John DeFore of The Hollywood Reporter said the film was "an unfocused feminist allegory". Jeannette Catsoulis of The New York Times said the film was a "satirical scream of rage against patriarchal prerogatives" and "has a vicious edge that can stifle your laughter".

References

External links 
 
 

2017 films
2017 black comedy films
American black comedy films
2010s English-language films
Films directed by Marianna Palka
2010s American films